Making Every Moment Count is the eighth and final studio album by Australian singer-songwriter Peter Allen, released in 1990, two years before his death from an AIDS-related illness.  It was his first album of entirely new material since 1983's "Not the Boy Next Door".

Reviews
William Ruhlmann from AllMusic gave the album 3 out of 5, saying; "There may [be] nods to his past, but otherwise Allen was very up to date on Making Every Moment Count, employing five different producers to come up with a recording that had a timely sound, complete with icy synthesizer riffs and programmed drums coming on like torpedoes.” He added, “he remained most affecting on the ballads, which had a poignancy that would be accentuated by Allen's death from AIDS in 1992.”

Track listing
 "Tonight You Made My Day" (Peter Allen, Seth Swirsky) - 4:12
 "Making Every Moment Count" (with Melissa Manchester) (Peter Allen, Seth Swirsky) - 3:58
 "When I Get My Name in Lights"(with Harry Connick Jr.) (Peter Allen) - 3:03
 "Nobody Can Break Us Up" (Michael Jay, Peter Allen) - 4:21
 "I Could Marry the Rain" (Peter Allen) - 3:08
 "See You in the Springtime" (Dean Pitchford, Peter Allen) - 4:08
 "So Much Depends On Love Today" (Peter Allen) - 4:41
 "Why Not?" (Dean Pitchford, Peter Allen) - 3:34
 "I Couldn't Have Done It Without You" (Peter Allen, Seth Swirsky) - 3:46
 "Love Don't Need a Reason" (Marsha Malamet, Michael Callen, Peter Allen) - 3:36

References

Peter Allen (musician) albums
1990 albums
RCA Records albums